Borah may refer to:

Bora (surname), an Assamese surname
William Borah (1865–1940), an American politician from Idaho
Borah Peak, highest point in Idaho
Borah High School, a public school in Boise
Charley Borah (1906–1980), an American athlete
Borah (dwelling of a witch), a farm near Lamorna, west Cornwall
Bohras, a subgroup of the Musta'li sect of Isma'ilism